Rehabilitation  of sensory and cognitive function typically involves methods for retraining neural pathways or training new neural pathways to regain or improve neurocognitive functioning that have been diminished by disease or trauma. The main objective outcome for rehabilitation is to assist in regaining physical abilities and improving performance.
Three common neuropsychological problems treatable with rehabilitation are attention deficit/hyperactivity disorder (ADHD), concussion, and spinal cord injury. Rehabilitation research and practices are a fertile area for clinical neuropsychologists, rehabilitation psychologists, and others.

Methods
Physical therapy, Speech therapy, occupational therapy, hot and cold therapy, and other methods that "exercise" specific brain functions are used. For example, eye–hand coordination exercises may rehabilitate certain motor deficits, or well structured planning and organizing exercises might help rehabilitate executive functions, following a traumatic blow to the head.

Brain functions that are impaired because of traumatic brain injuries are often the most challenging and difficult to rehabilitate. Much work is being done in nerve regeneration for the most severely damaged neural pathways.

Neurocognitive techniques, such as cognitive rehabilitation therapy, provide assessment and treatment of cognitive impairments from a variety of brain diseases and insults that cause persistent disability for many individuals. Such disabilities result in a loss of independence, a disruption in normal childhood activities and social relationships, loss in school attendance, and educational and employment opportunities. Injuries or insults that may benefit from neurocognitive rehabilitation include traumatic and acquired brain injuries (such as stroke, concussion, neurosurgery, etc.), cranial radiation, intrathecal chemotherapy and neurological disorders, such as ADHD. The rehabilitation targets cognitive functions such as attention, memory, and executive function (organization, planning, time management, etc.). Specific programs are tailored to develop and address an individual's challenges after a baseline assessment of abilities and challenges.

Concussion
Much research and focus has been given to concussion suffered frequently by athletes. While the severity of brain trauma has been standardized for immediate "sideline" assessment, much work needs to be done to understand how to rehabilitate or accelerate the rehabilitation of athletes' brain function following serious concussion—whether consciousness is lost or a dazed/confused feeling is experienced or not. Currently, rehabilitation of concussive brain injury is based on rest and gradual return to normal activities with as much involvement as can be tolerated.

Methods & Tools 

 Standardized neuropsychological tests
 These tasks have been designed so the performance on the task can be linked to specific neurocognitive processes. These tests are typically standardized, meaning that they have been administered to a specific group (or groups) of individuals before being used in individual clinical cases. The data resulting from standardization are known as normative data. After these data have been collected and analyzed, they are used as the comparative standard against which individual performances can be compared. Examples of neuropsychological tests include: the Wechsler Memory Scale (WMS), the Wechsler Adult Intelligence Scale (WAIS), Boston Naming Test, the Wisconsin Card Sorting Test, the Benton Visual Retention Test, and the Controlled Oral Word Association.

 Brain scans
 The use of brain scans to investigate the structure or function of the brain is common, either as simply a way of better assessing brain injury with high resolution pictures, or by examining the relative activations of different brain areas. Such technologies may include fMRI (functional magnetic resonance imaging) and positron emission tomography (PET), which yields data related to functioning, as well as MRI (magnetic resonance imaging) and computed axial tomography (CAT or CT), which yields structural data.

 Global Brain Project
 Brain models based on mouse and monkey have been developed based on theoretical neuroscience involving working memory and attention, while mapping brain activity based on time constants validated by measurements of neuronal activity in various layers of the brain. These methods also map to decision states of behavior in simple tasks that involve binary outcomes.

 Electrophysiology
 The use of electrophysiological measures designed to measure the activation of the brain by measuring the electrical or magnetic field produced by the nervous system. This may include electroencephalography (EEG) or magneto-encephalography (MEG).

 Experimental tasks
 The use of designed experimental tasks, often controlled by computer and typically measuring reaction time and accuracy on a particular tasks thought to be related to a specific neurocognitive process. An example of this is the Cambridge Neuropsychological Test Automated Battery (CANTAB) or CNS Vital Signs (CNSVS).

See also
 Clinical neuropsychology
 Cognitive neuropsychology
 Neuropsychology
 Occupational therapy
 Physical medicine and rehabilitation
 Physiotherapy
 Rehabilitation psychology
 Speech therapy

References

 McKay Moore Sohlberg and Catherine A. Mateer (2001) Cognitive Rehabilitation: An Integrative Neuropsychological Approach. Andover: Taylor and Francis
 Halligan, P.W., & Wade, D.T. (Eds.) (2005). Effectiveness of Rehabilitation for Cognitive Deficits. Oxford University Press, UK.

External links

Neurotrauma
Neuropsychology
Occupational therapy
Rehabilitation medicine